Mal Creevey (27 December 1956 – 10 August 1993) was an Australian professional rugby league footballer who played in the 1970s and 1980s. Creevey was a foundation player for Illawarra playing in the club's first season.

Background
Creevey was born in Sydney, Australia and played his junior rugby league for Greenacre.

Playing career
Creevey made his first grade debut for Canterbury against Newtown. Creevey played with Canterbury up until the end of the 1980 season and missed out on playing in the club's premiership victory over Eastern Suburbs in the 1980 NSWRL grand final.

In 1981, Creevey joined Balmain but it was an unsuccessful season for the club as they finished last on the table claiming the wooden spoon.

In 1982, Creevey joined newly admitted Illawarra and played in the club's first season featuring in 22 games. Creevey played a total of 32 games for Illawarra over 2 seasons.

Death
Creevey was killed in a car accident outside a Perth hotel in August 1993.

References

1956 births
1993 deaths
Canterbury-Bankstown Bulldogs players
Balmain Tigers players
Illawarra Steelers players
Australian rugby league players
Rugby league halfbacks
Rugby league players from Sydney
Road incident deaths in Australia